Allen Amason (born 1962) is an American professor, researcher, management consultant, and author. He is Dean & Professor of Management at the Parker College of Business at Georgia Southern University.

Early life and education 
Amason was born in Atlanta, GA and raised near Brunswick, GA, where he attended high school at Glynn Academy, graduating in 1980. He received his bachelor's degree in finance in 1984 from Georgia Southern University and his PhD in strategic management and international business in 1993 from the Moore School of Business at the University of South Carolina.

Career

Education and administration 
Amason began his academic career as an Assistant Professor of Management at Mississippi State University from 1993 to 1996. In 1996, Amason transitioned to the University of Georgia’s Terry College of Business, where he served as Assistant Professor of Management until 2001, when he was promoted to Associate Professor of Management.

In 2006, Amason was appointed chair of the Department of Management at the Terry College, where he has been responsible for redesigning its PhD program, increasing undergraduate enrollment, growing internship participation and student placement, along with research support and funding. During his tenure, the school became one of the top ranked management programs in the nation.

Georgia Southern University 
In 2013, Amason left the University of Georgia to become Professor of Management and Dean at the Parker College of Business at Georgia Southern University. As dean, Amason oversaw enrollment, student outcomes,  rankings and programmatic reputation, and significant growth in fundraising. Since 2013, the Parker College has received nearly $13 million in gifts and pledges, including a $5 million gift from Greg Parker, the largest single cash gift in the history of the university.

During his time at Georgia Southern, the Parker College launched multiple experiential learning programs, including Eagles on Wall Street, the Parker Business Scholars, Eagles on Penn Ave., Business Abroad, and Professional Development Day. 

Over the course of his career, Amason has also served in the following administrative positions:

 Lead Dean, Georgia WebMBA Consortium (2020 – Present)
 President, Southern Management Association, a regional affiliate of the Academy of Management (2008 – 2009)
 Founder and Interim Director, Terry College Music Business Program (2003 – 2006)
 Director, Undergraduate Advancement in Leadership Program, Institute for Leadership Advancement, Terry College of Business (2001 – 2003)
 Board of Governors, Southern Management Association (2000 – 2002)

Amason currently serves on the AACSB’s Continuous Improvement Review Committee (CIRC). Internationally, he led the initial accreditation reviews of IBS/RANEPA, Moscow, a leading business school in the Russian Federation and Al Ain University, a leading business school in the United Arab Emirates.

Consulting 
Amason is also a consultant, focused on strategic management and decision-making. His consulting practice has ranged from single-episode, analytical problem-solving engagements to long-term programs involving strategy, organizational development and implementation, and executive coaching.

Additionally, Amason has held the following positions:

 Board of Directors: Russian Foundation for Human Reproductive Health, Maintenance & Recovery. Moscow, Russian Federation. (2008 – 2022)
 Board of Directors: The Ocean Exchange, Savannah Georgia. (2014 – 2018)
 Board of Advisors: Georgia Oak Partners, Atlanta GA. (2009 – 2013)
 Strategic Partner and Consultant: Lore International, Durango, CO. (2003 – 2010)

Amason has worked with a variety of clients, nationally and internationally, including Advanced Micro Devices (AMD), Computer Associates (CA – Latin America), Davis Transportation, Exide Technologies, Johnson & Johnson (China), Nortel, Novartis, Park Evaluations, Primewest Energy, Rosetta Marketing, Schneider Electric, Tenet Healthcare, and the University of Georgia Athletic Association.

Researcher 
In his career as a researcher and author, Amason has written a variety of journal articles, chapters, and books. His book Strategic Management: From Theory to Practice was published in 2011 by Routledge. The second edition was co-authored by Andrew Ward, and published in 2021 by Routledge.

In August 2021, Amason was listed in Stanford University’s Science-Wide Author Databases of Standardized Citation Indicators, which lists the top 2% of scientists and researchers, worldwide, by discipline and citation counts.

Non-Fiction 
In addition to his career as professor, dean, researcher, and consultant, Amason is also the author of Expensive Yanna: An Adoption Story, which was published in 2015. The memoir tells the story of Amason and his late wife Cricket’s 16-month journey that culminated in the adoption of their fourth child.

Editorial 
Since 2015, Amason has served on the Strategic Advisory Board for the Journal of Management Studies. In addition, Amason served in the following editorial positions:

 Associate Editor, Journal of Management Studies (2010 – 2015)
 Senior Associate Editor, Journal of Management (2002 – 2005)
 Associate Editor, International Journal of Conflict Management (1999 – 2002)

Publications on strategic management

Books 
In 2011, Amason published Strategic Management: From Theory to Practice, which focuses on how to create a sustainable competitive advantage with a second edition, co-authored by Andrew Ward, released in 2021. The book was recognized as among the top 25 strategic management texts by a 2021 study in the Journal of Management Education.

Both editions of Strategic Management: From Theory to Practice were met with critical acclaim. Professor of Management & Entrepreneurship at Florida Atlantic University Gary Castrogiovanni, said, “This may be the best strategic management textbook that I have seen in recent years.” Additionally, Philip Bromiley of University of California, Irvine, said, "Amason and Ward’s book provides a solid presentation of tools and insights necessary for a fine strategy text. It also nicely balances analytics of strategy and the management of strategy."

Selected publications

Honors & Recognitions 
In 2021 Amazon was named in the top 2% of Management & Organization Scholars worldwide, as recognized by Stanford University.

References

External links

1962 births
Living people